Cesare Poli (born 6 January 1945 in Breganze) is an Italian former professional footballer who made 195 appearances in Serie A playing as a defender for Lanerossi Vicenza, Internazionale and Cagliari.

Honours
Cagliari
 Serie A champion: 1969–70

References

1945 births
Living people
Italian footballers
Serie A players
L.R. Vicenza players
Inter Milan players
Cagliari Calcio players
Association football defenders